The British Quiz Association (BQA) runs the British Quizzing Championships on the first Saturday in September every year.

Quiz Championships 1999/2000
In 1999 and 2000 Trevor Montague had run a British Quiz Championships as a sport of the Mind Sports Olympiad.

BQA 2001 till 2004
The BQA was founded as his brainchild in a Reading Hotel on 10 July 2001.
The first chairman was Mastermind club president Tony Dart, Montague was to be the managing director and also present were Mark Labbett and Rob Linham.

The association ran British Championships in 2001–3, but went into a moribund state following resignations of many of the committee.

Change to IQA
In late 2004 Trevor Parry took over running the organisation but only four people competed in the 2004 event (see link).
At the same time a new British Quizzing Championships has successfully been run by IQA/quizzing.co.uk (follow the link for more details).

British Quiz Champions up to 2004
 1999 - Kevin Ashman 
 2000 - Kevin Ashman 
 2001 - Ian Bayley
 2002 - Kevin Ashman 
 2003 - John Wilson 
 2004 - Karl Whelan

External links
Report 1999
Report 2000
Trivia Quizzes
British Quiz Association 

Clubs and societies in the United Kingdom
Quiz games